The Hazara Democratic Party (HDP): is a political party of the Hazara people in Pakistan. It is mainly active in Quetta city, where up to half a million Hazara currently reside.

Establishment
In September 2002, the political worker, Scholar and other hazara tribesmen worked together to form a political platform for the Hazaras of Pakistan which will serve the nation for their rights and justice. After meeting with different political worker and tribesmen on July 1, 2003, they announced a national and political Party with the name of Hazara Democratic Party (هزاره ڈیموکریٹک پارٹی).

There are about 600,000 Hazaras in Balochistan, based in Quetta, Khuzdar, Zhob, Loralia and Dera Murad Jamali. Before the HDP's formation, Hazara people did not have a formal political entity and didn't have much share in provincial or national politics. But Hazara Democratic Party is trying to orient the community into becoming aware of the region's politics and to protect their interests.
Hazara Democratic Party also has a women's wing consisting of nine units. HDP encourage female participation on all levels of sociopolitical life. HDP is a liberal and democratic party and firmly believe in equal opportunities for women in national life.

Leader assassination 
Hussain Ali Yousafi, who was elected as a chairman of the Hazara Democratic Party on 26 September 2008, was shot dead by the banned Lashkar-e-Jhangvi Deobandi extremist group in the Pakistani city of Quetta on 26 January 2009. The death of Hussain Ali Yousafi was shocking not only for Hazaras but also for Pakistan and was condemned by the nation's leaders. Hussain Ali Yousafi was working for peace and humanity in his social and political time period of thirty years. Which lead to a worldwide protest against the assassination of Hussain Ali Yousofi and other assassinations of Hazaras.

Mr. Abdul Aziz Hazara who was elected as a major office-bearer at Hazara Democratic Party on 25 October 2010 was shot dead together with his youngest son Naveed Ullah (son) by the banned Lashkar-e-Jhangvi and Tehreek-e-Taliban Deobandi extremist group in Afghanistan city of Ghazni. The death of Abdul Aziz Hazara was shocking not only for Hazaras but also for Pakistan and was condemned. He was working for peace and humanity in his social and political time.

Worldwide protest 2012
In the beginning of 2012, HDP starting spreading word that they would arrange demonstrations against killings of Hazara people in Quetta and Afghanistan. These demonstrations were held worldwide.

Notable leaders

Chairmen
Muhammad Jawad Easar (2003 – 2008)
Hussain Ali Yousafi (September 2008 – January 2009)
Abdul Khaliq Hazara (November 2010 – Present)

Major office bearers

Other leaders
 Javad Hazara
 Ahmad Ali Kohzad, Nazim Halqa 60
 Mohammad Reza Hazara, Naib Nazim Halqa 60
 Mirza Hazara
 Mohammad Reza Wakil

See also
 Hussain Ali Yousafi
 Hazara Town
 Muhammad Musa

References

Further reading

External links

Social democratic parties
Democratic socialist parties
Socialist parties
Political parties of minorities
Socialist parties in Asia
Democratic socialist parties in Asia
Social democratic parties in Asia
Socialist parties in Pakistan
Political parties established in 2003
2003 establishments in Pakistan
Hazara political parties
Politics of Quetta